Protein FAM46C also known as family with sequence similarity 46, member C is a protein that, in humans, is encoded by the FAM46C gene at locus 1p12 spanning base pairs from 118,148,556 to 118,171,011.

Summary 
FAM46C is a protein of unknown function consisting of 391 amino acid residues that are translated from an mRNA consisting of 5720 base pairs. FAM46C was initially sequenced as part of the Full-length long Japan genomic sequencing project. FAM46C is found on chromosome 1 at the locus 1p12 FAM46C contains one domain of unknown function, DUF1693, and as such has been placed in the DUF1693 protein family. This protein family has been established as a part of the Nucleotidyltransferase superfamily  and contains 4 nematode prion-like proteins. FAM46C was placed into group XXV of the nucleotidyltransferase superfamily along with 3 other Homo sapiens FAM46 proteins (A, B, D).

It has been suggested that FAM46C may be functionally involved with the Type 1 interferon response. Deletion and/ or mutation of FAM46C has been associated with impaired overall survival in Myeloma patients.

Gene 
Homo sapiens FAM46C spans 22,456 bases on chromosome 1. Microarray data suggests that human FAM46C displays elevated expression levels in bone marrow, CD71+ early erythroid, various B-cells, T-cells, and lymphocytes, as well as all tissues associated with testes.

Evolution and homology 
Homo sapiens FAM46C is highly conserved in close orthologs with only small changes in protein AA sequence when comparing to other mammals.

FAM46C and specifically the DUF1693 is traceable throughout the known metazoans, with a distant homolog found in Trichoplax adhaerens, a member of the basal multicellular organismal group Placozoa.

Paralogs 

Homo sapiens FAM46C is paralogous to 3 separate known FAM46 proteins, all of which contain DUF1693.

Orthologs 

There are  numerous FAM46C orthologs present throughout the current catalog of multicellular organisms, all of which exhibit impressive conservation of domain of unknown function 1693. The most notable ortholog is taken to be TRIADDRAFT14293, a gene of the species Trichoplax adhaerens. This ortholog provides evidence that FAM46C is a member of a group of proteins containing highly conserved amino acid residues, and as such it is thought to provide some highly important function, as would be expected when considering its possible nucleotidyltransferase activity.

Homologous domains 

In order to determine possible conserved structures, a predictive approach was utilized with regards to comparison of FAM46C with the most distant homolog available, that of Trichoplax adhearens. PHYRE2  was used to predict protein secondary structure of human FAM46C as well as trichoplax TRIADDRAFT-14293. We are able to visualize possible structures predicted with high confidence in both the human gene, as well as the placozoan gene. This preliminary prediction offers some insight into important structures, most probably of catalytic and/or binding function.

Phylogeny 

Based on multiple sequence alignments generated by ClustalW an unrooted phylogenetic tree was generated for select FAM46C orthologs in order to demonstrate the diverse occurrences of FAM46C-like genes throughout the current evolutionary catalog. For posterity, many orthologs were omitted (see ortholog table above; many were omitted from this table as well).

Protein structure 

"Homo sapiens" FAM46C encodes a 391 amino acid protein with no known isoforms. "Homo sapiens" FAM46C has not been crystallized and its secondary structure has not yet been determined as of May 2013. FAM46C has a predicted isoelectric point of 5.338. The protein contains one domain of unknown function, DUF1693 (Pfam: PF07984)

A Leucine zipper pattern was found beginning at Lys113 and ending at Lys134. This could help distinguish nuclear proteins from non-nuclear proteins, however all other subsets of analyses using PSORTII have predicted that FAM46C is strictly a cytosolic protein.

No other significant protein structural motifs have been predicted.

Protein-protein interactions 

FAM46C has been experimentally shown to interact physically with at least 4 separate proteins, with other interactions that have been predicted

References

External links 
  - The homepage of the Full-length long Japan human genomic sequencing project

Genes on human chromosome 1